Edward John Mooney (born February 26, 1945) is a former professional American football linebacker for five seasons for the Detroit Lions and Baltimore Colts in the National Football League. He was drafted by the Lions in the fourth round (93rd overall) of the 1968 NFL draft.

College career 
Edward came to Tech on a track scholarship from a junior-college in Nebraska. Tech track and field coach Vernon Hilliard recruited him, and a football assistant, seeing Mooney’s 6-3, 245-pound stature, talked him into making time for both sports.  In college, Mooney played football and was on the track team for Texas Technological College (now Texas Tech University).  Mooney was an all-SWC linebacker for Tech in 1967, using that as a springboard to play in the East-West Shrine Game

Professional career 
Playing linebacker during his five years in the league, Mooney played his first four seasons with the Lions, and finished his final season with the Colts. He also played for the Houston Texans of the World Football League.

External links 
http://www.pro-football-reference.com/players/M/MoonEd20.htm

1945 births
Living people
Sportspeople from Brooklyn
Players of American football from New York City
American football linebackers
Texas Tech Red Raiders football players
Detroit Lions players
Baltimore Colts players